Plenodomus meliloti is a plant pathogen infecting alfalfa and red clover.

References

Fungal plant pathogens and diseases
Pleosporales